The canton of Saint-Brice-en-Coglès is a former canton of France, located in the arrondissement of Fougères-Vitré, in the Ille-et-Vilaine département, Brittany région. It had 12,106 inhabitants (2012). It was disbanded following the French canton reorganisation which came into effect in March 2015. It consisted of 11 communes, which joined the canton of Antrain in 2015.

Composition
The canton comprised the following communes:

 Baillé
 Le Châtellier
 Coglès
 Montours
 Saint-Brice-en-Coglès
 Saint-Étienne-en-Coglès
 Saint-Hilaire-des-Landes
 Saint-Germain-en-Coglès
 Saint-Marc-le-Blanc
 La Selle-en-Coglès
 Le Tiercent

References

Saint-Brice-en-Cogles
2015 disestablishments in France
States and territories disestablished in 2015